
"Iron horse" is a literary term for a train or locomotive.

Iron horse or Ironhorse may also refer to:

Film and television 
 The Iron Horse (film), a 1924 silent film directed by John Ford
 The Iron Horse (TV series), a 1960s American Western series

Geography
 Iron Horse, California
 Iron Horse, a neighborhood in Tucson, Arizona
 Iron Horse Expansion Historic District, on the National Register of Historic Places in Pima County, Arizona
 Iron Horse Trail (disambiguation), any of several trails in the United States and Canada
 Iron Horse State Park, a rail trail in Washington

Establishments
 Iron Horse Middle School, San Ramon, California
 Iron Horse Night Club, a bar in Edmonton, Alberta, formerly the Strathcona Canadian Pacific Railway Station

Music 
 Iron Horse Music Hall, a live concert venue in Northampton, Massachusetts
 The Iron Horse (Scottish band)
 Iron Horse (band), an American bluegrass band
 Ironhorse, a short-lived offspring of Canadian rock band Bachman-Turner Overdrive
 "Iron Horse", a 1972 song by Christie (band)
 "Iron Horse / Born to Lose", a song by Motörhead from the 1970s album On Parole

Other uses 
 Iron Horse, a Cold War era surveillance network of AN/FLR-9 antenna arrays
 Iron Horse Bicycles, a bicycle manufacturer
  Iron Horse (magazine), an American motorcycling publication
 "Iron Horse" (poem), by Allen Ginsberg
 The Iron Horse, a roller coaster at Freestyle Music Park in Myrtle Beach, South Carolina  
 Nickname for the 4th Infantry Division (United States)
 The D-400 engine, or Iron Horse lawnmower engine
 Iron Horse Track, a type of roller coaster track developed by Rocky Mountain Construction
 "The Iron Horse", a nickname for baseball player Lou Gehrig
 "The Iron Horse", a nickname for American football player Alan Ameche
 Iron horse, a nickname for motorcycles
 Iron Horse Literary Review, a publication of Texas Tech University
 Iron Horse (sculpture), in Watkinsville, Georgia

See also 
 Iron Horsemen, a motorcycle club